Mawene Hiroti (born 6 March 1999) is a New Zealand rugby league footballer who plays as a  or er for the Cronulla-Sutherland Sharks In the NRL. 

He previously played for the South Sydney Rabbitohs in the National Rugby League.

Background
Hiroti was born in Taranaki, New Zealand.

Playing career

2016
Educated at Matraville Sports High School he represented the 2016 Australian Schoolboys and the New Zealand Under 18s.

2018
He played for South Sydney in their pre-season 18–8 victory over Super League team, the Wigan Warriors.

Hiroti made his first grade debut for South Sydney in Round 23 2018 against Brisbane at Suncorp Stadium which ended in a 38–18 loss.  Hiroti spent the majority of the season playing for South Sydney's feeder club side North Sydney in the Intrust Super Premiership NSW.  At the end of 2018, Hiroti was named as North Sydney's most improved player.

2019
On 29 September 2019, Hiroti was named in the 2019 Canterbury Cup NSW team of the year.

2020
Signing with Cronulla-Sutherland prior to the 2020 season, Hiroti spent the majority of the season training with the clubs’ feeder side Newtown before the reserve grade season was cancelled due to the COVID-19 pandemic. He made two appearances with the top-flight squad in 2020.

2021
After both of Cronulla's usual wingers were struck with injury, Hiroti took a bigger role with the NRL side to open the 2021 NRL season, managing six appearances through the first eight rounds, managing four tries.

On 2 September, Hiroti signed a one-year extension to remain at Cronulla for the 2022 season.
Hiroti played 15 games for Cronulla in the 2021 NRL season which saw the club narrowly miss the finals by finishing 9th on the table.

Statistics

NRL
 Statistics are correct as of the end of the 2022 season

References

External links
Cronulla Sharks profile
South Sydney Rabbitohs profile

1999 births
Living people
New Zealand rugby league players
New Zealand Māori rugby league players
South Sydney Rabbitohs players
Cronulla-Sutherland Sharks players
North Sydney Bears NSW Cup players
Newtown Jets NSW Cup players
Rugby league wingers
Rugby league centres
Rugby league fullbacks
Rugby league players from Taranaki